Emerson Nieto (born October 3, 2001) is an American professional soccer player who plays as a midfielder for Indiana Hoosiers.

Career
On May 14, 2019, it was announced that Nieto would join USL Championship side Indy Eleven on an academy contract. The academy contract would keep Nieto college eligible for 2020, where he has committed to playing college soccer at Indiana University.

He made his professional debut on June 26, 2019, appearing as an injury-time substitute during a 3-0 win over Birmingham Legion.

References

External links
 USL Championship bio

2001 births
Living people
American soccer players
Association football midfielders
Indy Eleven players
Soccer players from Indiana
USL Championship players
Sportspeople from Fort Wayne, Indiana
Indiana Hoosiers men's soccer players